A meatball is a meat-based food preparation.  

Meatball(s) or Meat Ball(s) may also refer to:

Food 
 Pork meatball (disambiguation)
 Swedish meatball

Arts, entertainment, and media
Meatballs (film), 1979 film by Ivan Reitman, starring Bill Murray, and its sequels:
Meatballs 2
Meatballs III
Meatballs 4
 "One Meat Ball", a song by George Martin Lane
Meatball, a main character in the preschool series 44 Cats
Meatballs (advertisement), an ad for Pat Buchanan’s 2000 United States presidential campaign
Meatball (drag queen), the drag queen persona of Logan Jennings, in The Boulet Brothers' Dragula

Insults
Meatball, an idiot
Meatball, an ethnic slur for an Italian-American

Military
An optical landing system, as installed on CATOBAR-oriented aircraft carriers
A derogatory term for the Japanese military aircraft insignia in WWII; see Hinomaru
Battlefield medicine, or "meatball surgery", treatment of wounded soldiers in or near an area of combat

Other uses
Meatball (wrestler), ring name of American professional wrestler Richard Ellinger (born 1970)
A baseball term for an easy pitch to hit — down the middle of the plate
EMD AEM-7, an American locomotive nicknamed "Meatball"
NASA logo, in use prior to 1975 and since 1992
Flag of Japan, which was describes by American forces derogatively as "meatballs"

See also
 MeatballWiki, a wiki dedicated to online culture
 Bait ball
 Metaballs